Kepler-33 is a star in the constellation of Cygnus with a system of five known planets. Having just begun to evolve off from the main sequence, its radius and mass are difficult to ascertain, although data available in 2020 shows its best-fit mass of 1.3 and diameter of 1.6 are compatible with a model of a subgiant star.

Planetary system
First detections of the four-body planetary system were reported in February 2011. On January 26, 2012, a 5th planet around the star was confirmed. However, unlike other planets confirmed via Kepler, their masses were initially not known, as Doppler Spectroscopy measurements were not done before the announcement. Judging by their radii, b may be a large Super-Earth or small Hot Neptune while the other four are all likely to be the latter.

Planets b and c may actually be in a 7:3 resonance, as there is a 0.05 day discrepancy; there is also a small 0.18 day discrepancy between a 5:3 resonance between planets c and d. The other planets do not seem to be in any resonances, though near resonances are 3d:2e and 4e:3f.

The planetary system in current configuration is highly susceptible to perturbations, therefore assuming stability, no additional giant planets can be located within 30 AU from the parent star.

See also
 55 Cancri
 Kepler-11
 Kepler-20

References

Cygnus (constellation)
G-type subgiants
707
Planetary transit variables
Planetary systems with five confirmed planets
J19161861+4600187